Sam Rowlands is a British politician serving as Shadow Minister for Local Government in the Welsh Parliament.  A member of the Conservative and Unionist Party, he has been a Member of the Welsh Parliament for the North Wales Electoral Region since the 2021 Senedd election.

Prior to his election to the Senedd, Rowlands was a member of Conwy County Borough Council and Abergele Town Council, being first elected in the 2008 Welsh Local Government Elections.  He served as the Mayor of Abergele from 2015 to 2016 and the Leader of Conwy County Borough Council from June 2019 until May 2021.  He previously served as the Cabinet Member for Finance and Resources between June 2017 and June 2019.  Rowlands also stood in the Vale of Clwyd in the 2016 Welsh Assembly Election, where he secured the biggest swing to the Conservative Party in Wales.

Political interests
Following his election to the Senedd, Rowlands re-established the Cross Party Group on Tourism, championing the role of the sector in the North Wales economy.  Rowlands led a campaign working with Conwy County Borough Council to re-establish the Conwy County Borough School's Football Association in 2021.  Rowlands has spoken on the importance of sport to keep people fit and healthy as well as a driver for economic development in the Welsh Parliament.  In 2022 he also became the Chairman of Welsh Parliament Cross Party Group on the Outdoor Activity Sector.

During July 2022 Rowlands's proposed Outdoor Education (Wales) Bill was drawn in the Welsh Parliament's ballot of proposed member's bills.  On 26 October 2022 the Welsh Parliament voted to allow time and resources to be committed to developing this ground breaking legislation further, with Conservative, Plaid Cymru and Liberal Democrat MSs supporting the decision and the Labour Party attempting to block the bill from being developed.

References

Year of birth missing (living people)
Living people
Conservative Party members of the Senedd
Wales MSs 2021–2026
Welsh Conservative councillors
People from Conwy County Borough